Octavio Is Dead! is a Canadian supernatural drama film directed by Sook-Yin Lee, which premiered on June 2, 2018 at the Inside Out Film and Video Festival before going into theatrical release on June 22.

The film stars Sarah Gadon as Tyler, a young woman who unexpectedly inherits all of her estranged father Octavio's (Raoul Trujillo) possessions after his death. Over the objections of her domineering mother Joan (Rosanna Arquette), she goes to the apartment, only to discover that her father is still present there as a ghost who leads her through a complex exploration of her sexual and personal identity. While wearing her father's clothes, she meets and becomes attracted to Apostolis (Dimitris Kitsos), a gay university student who perceives her as a man.

Reception

The film received four Canadian Screen Award nominations at the 7th Canadian Screen Awards in 2019, for Best Cinematography (Daniel Grant), Best Art Direction or Production Design (Elisa Sauve), Best Costume Design (Hanna Puley) and Best Original Song (Lee, Adam Litovitz and Alia O'Brien for "Ghost of Love (Onakabazien Remix)".

The film had its television premiere on July 20, 2019 on CBC Television.

References

External links

2018 films
English-language Canadian films
Canadian ghost films
Canadian drama films
2018 drama films
Films directed by Sook-Yin Lee
Canadian LGBT-related films
2018 LGBT-related films
LGBT-related drama films
2010s English-language films
2010s Canadian films